Stenoptilia columbia is a moth of the family Pterophoridae. It is found in Alberta and British Columbia.

References

Moths described in 1927
columbia
Moths of North America